Gabriele Wülker (16 July 1911 – 10 October 2001), was a German social scientist and civil servant. She was the State Secretary (senior civil servant) of the Federal Ministry of Family Affairs, Senior Citizens, Women and Youth from 1957 to 1959. She was the first of her gender in this position of her country.

Works 
 1941 : Bauerntum am Rande der Großstadt. II. Bevölkerungs- und Wirtschaftswachstum im 19. und 20. Jahrhundert (Hainholz, Vahrenwald und List bei Hannover), Leipzig, S. Hirzel.
 1952 : with Werner Möhring, Europa und die deutschen Flüchtlinge.
 1953 : Probleme der soziologischen Einordnung fremder ethnischer Gruppen in die deutsche Bundesrepublik, Cologne.
 1962 : In Asien und Afrika, Kreuz-Verlag.
 1966 : Togo - Tradition und Entwicklung, Klett Verlag.

1911 births
2001 deaths
German social scientists
20th-century German civil servants
Knights Commander of the Order of Merit of the Federal Republic of Germany
State Secretaries of Germany